The 2022 Ladbrokes Masters was the tenth staging of the non-ranking Masters darts tournament, held by the Professional Darts Corporation (PDC). It was held from 28 to 30 January 2022 at the Marshall Arena in Milton Keynes, England.

Jonny Clayton was the defending champion after beating Mervyn King 11–8 in the 2021 final, but he lost 11–6 to Dave Chisnall in the semi-finals.

Joe Cullen won his first televised title by defeating Chisnall 11–9 in the final. He subsequently earned a place in the 2022 Premier League Darts, for the first time in his career.

This event was the last PDC event to use dartboards provided by Unicorn, as they announced that they would end their 25-year association with the PDC following this event.

Qualifiers
The Masters featured the top 24 players in the PDC Order of Merit after the 2022 PDC World Darts Championship, with the top 8 automatically qualifying for the second round. Dirk van Duijvenbode, Ryan Searle, Luke Humphries and Gabriel Clemens made their debuts in the event.

Danny Noppert, who was due to be making his debut as 18th seed, withdrew after the draw for family reasons and was replaced by Simon Whitlock.

On 24 January, it was announced that Nathan Aspinall had withdrawn from the tournament, due to injury, and was replaced by Devon Petersen, who became the fifth debutant.

The following players took part in the tournament:

Prize money
The prize money was £220,000 in total, the same as 2021.

Draw

References

Masters
Masters (darts)
Masters (darts)
Masters (darts)
Sport in Milton Keynes
2020s in Buckinghamshire